Crowsnest Provincial Park is a provincial park in British Columbia, Canada, located within the District Municipality of Sparwood,  east of Fernie on BC Highway 3, just inside the BC side of the Crowsnest Pass.

References

Provincial parks of British Columbia
Parks in the Regional District of East Kootenay
Elk Valley (British Columbia)
Year of establishment missing